The Gryazev-Shipunov GSh-23 is a twin-barreled 23 mm autocannon developed in the Soviet Union, primarily for military aircraft use. It entered service in 1965, replacing the earlier Nudelman-Rikhter NR-23 and Rikhter R-23.

The GSh-23 works on the Gast Gun principle developed by German engineer Karl Gast of the Vorwerk company in 1916. It is a twin-barreled weapon in which the firing action of one barrel operates the mechanism of the other. It provides a much faster rate of fire for lower mechanical wear than a single-barrel weapon.

Although it cannot match the sustained rate of fire of an electric Gatling gun like the M61 Vulcan, its initial rate of fire can be higher than that of a rotary cannon like the M61 due to it not needing to spin up to fire. It requires no external power source to operate, but is instead powered by the recoiling of the floating barrels, somewhat like the action of the German MG-42. The Gast principle has been little used in the West, but was used on a variety of weapons in the former Soviet Union.

The cannon comes in a basic GSh-23 variant, and the more popular GSh-23L, differing mostly in adding a muzzle brake, lowering recoil force. This cannon was standard fit on late-model MiG-21 fighters (M, SM, MF, SMT, PFM, bis), all variants of the MiG-23, the SOKO J-22 Orao, the JF-17 Thunder,  the HAL Tejas and IAR 93, and the tail turrets of the Tupolev Tu-22M bomber and some late-model Tu-95MS and Tu-142M3. In that application, it had the unusual ability to fire infrared flares and chaff rounds, allowing it to function as both a weapon and a dispenser of anti-missile countermeasures. It is also mounted on late small series Mi-24VP helicopters (in the NPPU-23 movable mounting) and Polish W-3WA Sokół helicopter in fixed mounting. The cannon was also used on cargo aircraft; specifically, Russian/Soviet Ilyushin Il-76 aircraft were designed to accommodate twin GSh-23's in a tail turret. An Il-76M with just such a configuration could be seen at the 2002 Ivanovo airshow.

Some second generation MiG-21 models could carry the GSh-23L in an under-fuselage gondola designated the GP-9, carrying the cannon and 200 rounds of ammunition; this was replaced by a more streamlined semi-conformal installation in later variants. There are also several gun pods available for mounting on external hardpoints: UPK-23 for air-to-air use, with one or two fixed GSh-23 guns and 200–400 rounds of ammunition, and SPPU-22 pods with traversable barrels for strafing, from 0° to −30° and carried 280 rounds of ammunition in each (they were most often carried by the Su-17/-20/-22 as well as the Su-25/-39 in pairs).

Variants
Gryazev-Shipunov GSh-23L, is a modernized air-cooled version with a muzzle brake added to reduce recoil. Used on NPPU-23 helicopter turret.
Gryazev-Shipunov GSh-23V, is a water-cooled version of GSh-23L. Used on NPPU-23 helicopter turret.

Users

 - Used on Mi-35M

 Manufactured at Ordnance Factories Board
 on Iraqi aircraft type Su-25
 - JF-17 Thunder (all variants)

 – manufactured locally by SC Uzina Mecanică Cugir as GȘ-23.

 on SU-25M1
 – Used on L-59T Super-Albatross
 – Used on L-59T Super-Albatross

Gallery

See also
Gryazev-Shipunov GSh-6-23
Gryazev-Shipunov GSh-6-30
KS-23
List of modern Russian small arms and light weapons
List of multiple-barrel firearms
GAU-12 Equalizer
Minigun
Vyacheslav Ivanovich Silin

References

Autocannons of the Soviet Union
Aircraft guns of the Soviet Union
23 mm artillery
KBP Instrument Design Bureau products
Military equipment introduced in the 1960s